Melevisione (portmanteau from , "apples", and , "television") is an Italian children's television program that aired in the early afternoon between 1999 and 2015 on Rai Tre, and some time after the start on Rai Yoyo too. It focuses on the adventures of fabulous characters: elves, princes, witches and so on. The main character Tonio Cartonio was played by Danilo Bertazzi from 1999 to 2004, and was then followed by Milo Cotogno (Lorenzo Branchetti).

The episode entitled "Chi ha paura del lupo cattivo" was also dubbed in English with the title "Who's afraid of the big bad wolf".

Broadcast Italy history 
Rai Tre / Rai Yoyo (18 January 1999 – May 2, 2015)

References

External links

Italian children's television series